Josh Baldwin is an American Christian singer, songwriter and worship pastor. A member of the Bethel Music collective, Baldwin also serves as a worship leader at Bethel Church in Redding, California.

Josh Baldwin starting serving as a worship leader at MorningStar Fellowship Church after attending the ministry school there. He independently released Changing, his first album, in 2008. In 2010, Baldwin then joined Queen City Church in Charlotte, North Carolina, serving as worship pastor. Baldwin released Rivers in 2014, earning him his first Billboard chart appearance with a placement on the US Heatseekers Albums.

Josh Baldwin signed with Bethel Music in 2014, and moved to Redding, California to join Bethel Church. Baldwin made his first feature on a Bethel Music collective release, Have It All (2016), with the song "Praises (Be Lifted Up)". Baldwin then released The War Is Over, his first solo effort with the label in mid-2017 to critical acclaim and the album debuted in the top-three sector of the American and British Christian music charts.

Bethel Music and Josh Baldwin released the song "Stand in Your Love" in 2018, as the lead single to Victory (2019). The song reached the top ten of the US Christian Songs chart, Baldwin's first entry on the chart. It also garnered Baldwin's first nominations for the 2019 K-Love Fan Awards in the Breakout Single of the Year and Worship Song of the Year categories.

Early life 
Joshua Aaron Baldwin was born on July 8, 1979, to William Baldwin, a pastor, and Kathy Baldwin in Albemarle, North Carolina. Baldwin shared that his father was also a worship leader and is "very much into music," and grew up playing drums for him and other worship leaders. He started leading worship and playing guitar during his high school years, learning at Albemarle High School. Baldwin, at nineteen-twenty years, was studying at Lee University when he first realized that he wanted to be a worship leader after leading at a youth camp in North Carolina, thus dropping out of Lee University and enrolled at MorningStar Ministry School, attending together with John Mark McMillan and Jonathan David Helser.

Career 
Josh Baldwin started his career with MorningStar in early 2008, featuring on two albums: Worship and Warfare, Vol. 3 with the song "After You"; and Jesus Broken with "Love You Only". He was a part of MorningStar Fellowship Church for nine years, and he also travelled with artists Rita Springer and Suzy Yaraei working as a drummer. Baldwin served as the worship minister at MorningStar in Wilkesboro, North Carolina. On September 3, 2008, Josh Baldwin independently released his debut album, Changing. Baldwin then moved to Charlotte, North Carolina, to serve as worship pastor of Queen City Church.

On September 17, 2013, Josh Baldwin launched a Kickstarter funding campaign to raise $12,000 for a new worship album's mixing, mastering, printing, and artwork to be completed. The campaign was a success, with 202 backers pledging $12,635, with a twenty two day period that ended on October 10, 2013. Baldwin released Rivers, his sophomore album on January 28, 2014, in partnership with Watershed Music. Rivers peaked at No. 44 on the Heatseekers Albums chart issued by Billboard, his first entry on a Billboard'''s chart. In 2014, Baldwin went on to sign a record deal with Bethel Music during a week-long visit with his wife to Redding, California after discussions with Brian Johnson, whom he knew since meeting in 2007. On March 11, 2016, Bethel Music then released its eighth live album dubbed Have It All, with Baldwin performing a live cover of his song, "Praises (Be Lifted Up)".

Josh Baldwin released his first album with Bethel Music, The War Is Over, on May 26, 2017. The War Is Over earned sales of 3,000 equivalent album units in its opening week, and thus debuted at No. 2 on the US Christian Albums chart dated June 17, 2017, issued by  Billboard. The album also debuted at No. 3 on the Official Christian & Gospel Albums Chart in the United Kingdom. "Get Your Hopes Up" was released as the first single from the album.

On July 19, 2018, Bethel Music and Josh Baldwin published the song "Stand in Your Love" on YouTube. They subsequently released "Stand in Your Love" on August 10, 2018, as the first single from the Bethel Music's album, Victory (2019). The single was a hit as it became his first entry on the US Christian Songs chart, and peaked at No. 7. It garnered nominations for 2019 K-Love Fan Awards in the Breakout Single of the Year and Worship Song of the Year categories. On July 19, 2019, Josh Baldwin released "Let the Redeemed" as a single.

 Personal life 
Josh Baldwin married Sheila Strite and they have two children, Ellie and Bear.

 Discography 
 Albums 

 Extended plays 
 Live at Church (EP)'' (2020)

Singles

As lead artist

As featured artist

Other appearances

Awards

GMA Dove Awards 

|-
|rowspan="2"| 2019 || Josh Baldwin || New Artist of the Year || 
|-
| "Stand in Your Love" || Worship Recorded Song of the Year || 
|}

See also 

 List of Christian worship music artists

References

External links 
  
  on Bethel Music
  on AllMusic

1979 births
Living people
Christians from California
American Charismatics
American male singer-songwriters
American performers of Christian music
Composers of Christian music
People from Albemarle, North Carolina
Singer-songwriters from North Carolina
21st-century American male singers
21st-century American singers